Black Mountain is a  mountain summit located on the crest of the Sierra Nevada mountain range in northern California. It is situated on the common border of Fresno County with Inyo County, as well as the shared boundary of John Muir Wilderness and Kings Canyon National Park. Black Mountain ranks as the 91st highest summit in California. The John Muir Trail traverses below the west aspect of this peak, providing an approach to the mountain. The first ascent of the summit was made in 1905 by George R. Davis, a USGS topographer. This mountain is habitat for the endangered Sierra Nevada bighorn sheep, which restricts climbing from July through December, so most ascents are made in the spring.

Climate
According to the Köppen climate classification system, Black Mountain has an alpine climate. Most weather fronts originate in the Pacific Ocean, and travel east toward the Sierra Nevada mountains. As fronts approach, they are forced upward by the peaks, causing them to drop their moisture in the form of rain or snowfall onto the range (orographic lift). Precipitation runoff from this mountain drains east to the Owens Valley via Oak Creek, and west into the Kings River watershed.

Gallery

See also
 
 List of mountain peaks of California
 Dragon Peak

References

External links
 Weather forecast: National Weather Service

Mountains of Fresno County, California
Mountains of Kings Canyon National Park
Inyo National Forest
Mountains of Inyo County, California
Mountains of the John Muir Wilderness
North American 4000 m summits
Mountains of Northern California
Sierra Nevada (United States)